Howard Graham Crocker (October 4, 1912 – November 8, 1984) was a Canadian politician. He served in the Legislative Assembly of New Brunswick from 1960 to 1974 as member of the Liberal party.

References

1912 births
1984 deaths